The Eliza G. Yount House, at 423 Seminary St. in Napa, California, was built in 1884.  It was listed on the National Register of Historic Places in 1992.

References

External links

National Register of Historic Places in Napa County, California
Victorian architecture in California
Houses completed in 1884
1884 establishments in California